Jenny Yvonne "Ginette" Spanier (7 March 1904 – April 1988) was director of the House of Balmain, a Paris fashion-house, and was decorated for her wartime work.

Early life
Spanier, who was Jewish, was born in Paris on 7 March 1904 and raised in Hampstead, London, England and attended Frognal School there.

War years
While in Paris as a buyer for Fortnum & Mason, she met Paul-Emile Seidmann, a doctor. In 1939, they married. Shortly afterwards, during World War II, they fled Nazi-occupied Paris by bicycle. She was subsequently awarded the Medal of Freedom for assisting the American Army of Liberation.

Balmain

After the war, the couple lived for many years on Paris' Avenue Maurice, and she became  (director) at Balmain from 1947 to 1976. The first of her two volumes of autobiography, It isn't All Mink (1959), had a foreword by Noël Coward, the second volume, And Now It's Sables (1970), had one by Maurice Chevalier.

Spanier appeared as a castaway on the BBC Radio programme Desert Island Discs on 21 June 1965. The programme was not archived by the BBC, but an unofficial tape copy was among a collection of over 90 episodes discovered by an amateur researcher and placed online in 2022. She was also the guest on This Is Your Life on 9 February 1972.

Death
She retired, a widow, to London, and died there in April 1988.

Bibliography

References

External links 
 Newspaper article with photograph

1904 births
1988 deaths
People from Hampstead
Businesspeople from Paris
French expatriates in the United Kingdom
French fashion designers
French women fashion designers
French autobiographers
Jews who immigrated to the United Kingdom to escape Nazism
20th-century French Jews